Evan Neil Dunham (born December 18, 1981) is an American professional mixed martial artist competing in the lightweight division. He is perhaps best known for 21-fight tenure in the Ultimate Fighting Championship which spanned over a decade.

Background
Dunham, born and raised in Eugene, Oregon, began wrestling in middle school and continued at Winston Churchill High School. Dunham later attended the University of Oregon, and in 2000 he began training in Brazilian jiu-jitsu. He graduated with a degree in sociology, and worked in various jobs before becoming a fighter full-time.

Mixed martial arts career

Early career
In an amateur bout in 2006 (a year before his professional debut), Dunham fought fellow future UFC lightweight title challenger Gray Maynard. Dunham lost the fight via unanimous decision.

Dunham made his professional debut in 2007; he had five fights total that year. After winning six straight, Dunham was invited to fight for Palace Fighting Championship, a mid-size organization. He won his fight over Team Alpha Male's Dustin Akbari via rear-naked choke submission and remained undefeated.

Ultimate Fighting Championship
Dunham made his UFC debut on February 21, 2009 against Per Eklund at UFC 95. He showed an aggressive style, knocking the more experienced Eklund out with a straight left at 2:14 of round one.

Dunham had his second fight in the UFC when he defeated returning veteran Marcus Aurélio via split decision at UFC 102. He showed quick and accurate striking skills and displayed some excellent submission defense against the seasoned grappler.

Dunham's third fight was against The Ultimate Fighter 8 winner, Efrain Escudero on January 11, 2010 at UFC Fight Night 20 where the fight was the co-main event. Dunham rallied from a rough first round, taking the second and finally finishing with an armbar in the third round, nearly breaking Escudero's arm. The submission earned him an extra $30,000 for winning Submission of the Night honors.

Dunham faced Xtreme Couture standout and ex-training partner Tyson Griffin, on June 12, 2010 at UFC 115. Dunham was dominant in all three rounds, taking Griffin's back on numerous occasions and effectively countering strikes. He won the fight via split decision.

Dunham faced former UFC Lightweight Champion Sean Sherk on September 25, 2010 at UFC 119. He received the first loss of his MMA career via controversial split decision. Sherk utilized his wrestling during round 1, opening up a large cut above Dunham's right eye and boxing well in the early part of round 2, while Dunham utilized submissions and effective striking throughout the latter parts of rounds 2 and 3. UFC president Dana White later said that he felt Dunham was 'robbed'. The bout was awarded Fight of the Night honors.

Dunham was expected to face Kenny Florian at UFC 126, but the bout instead was moved to headline UFC Fight Night 23 on January 22, 2011. Dunham confirmed the fight on his personal Facebook page. However, on December 6, Florian pulled out of the bout due to injury. Instead, Melvin Guillard, who had been set to fight Yves Edwards on the preliminary card, took on Dunham in the main event. Dunham lost via TKO in the first round after getting continuously hit by combinations from the much faster Guillard.

Dunham was expected to face George Sotiropoulos on July 2, 2011 at UFC 132. However, he was forced out of the bout due to an injury and replaced by Rafael dos Anjos.

Dunham faced Shamar Bailey on September 17, 2011 at UFC Fight Night 25. He won the fight via unanimous decision.

Dunham was expected to face Paul Sass on January 28, 2012 at UFC on Fox 2.  However, Sass was dropped from the bout because of an injury and replaced by Nik Lentz. Dunham defeated Lentz via TKO (doctor stoppage) at the conclusion of the second round.  The back and forth action earned both fighters Fight of the Night honors for their performance.

Dunham was expected to face Edson Barboza on May 26, 2012 at UFC 146, but was forced from the event with another injury and replaced by returning veteran Jamie Varner.

Dunham lost to T. J. Grant via unanimous decision on September 22, 2012 at UFC 152. Both fighters were awarded Fight of the Night honors.

Dunham faced Gleison Tibau on February 2, 2013 at UFC 156. He won the fight via split decision.

Dunham next fought Rafael dos Anjos on May 18, 2013 at UFC on FX 8. Dunham lost the back-and-forth fight via unanimous decision.

Dunham next opponent was Donald Cerrone at UFC 167. Dunham lost the fight via submission in the second round.

Dunham was expected to face Mark Bocek on April 16, 2014 at The Ultimate Fighter Nations Finale. However, Dunham pulled out of the bout in the week leading up to the event with an undisclosed injury.

Dunham fought Edson Barboza on July 16, 2014 at UFC Fight Night 45. Dunham lost the fight via TKO in the first round.

Dunham faced Rodrigo Damm on January 3, 2015 at UFC 182. He won the fight by unanimous decision.

Dunham defeated Ross Pearson on July 18, 2015 at UFC Fight Night 72. He won the fight by unanimous decision.

Dunham faced Joe Lauzon on December 11, 2015 at The Ultimate Fighter 22 Finale. He won the fight by unanimous decision.

Dunham was expected to face Leonardo Santos on June 4, 2016 at UFC 199. However, Santos pulled out on April 29 due to an undisclosed injury and was replaced by James Vick. In turn, Dunham pulled out of that pairing on May 5 for undisclosed reasons and was replaced by Beneil Dariush.

Dunham was scheduled to face Abel Trujillo on September 17, 2016 at UFC Fight Night 94. However, Trujillo pulled out of the fight on September 5, citing an undisclosed injury and was replaced by former WSOF Featherweight Champion and promotional newcomer Ricky Glenn. He won the fight via unanimous decision. Both participants were awarded Fight of the Night for their performance.

The bout with Trujillo was rescheduled and was expected to take place on February 4, 2017 at UFC Fight Night 104. However, on January 19, Dunham pulled out of the fight with an injury and was replaced by James Vick.

Dunham fought Beneil Dariush on October 7, 2017 at UFC 216. The fight ended in a majority draw.

Dunham was expected to face Mairbek Taisumov on April 7, 2018 at UFC 223. However, Taisumov was removed from the fight on March 9 for alleged visa issues, restricting his travel. Dunham instead faced Olivier Aubin-Mercier at the event. He lost the fight by TKO in the first round.

Dunham faced Francisco Trinaldo on September 22, 2018 at UFC Fight Night 137. He lost the fight via knockout in the second round due to a knee to the body. He announced his retirement after the fight.

Dunham returned from retirement and was scheduled to face Michael Johnson on April 25, 2020. However, on April 9, Dana White, the president of UFC announced that the event was postponed to a future date and the matchup was later scrapped.

Dunham faced Herbert Burns on June 6, 2020 at UFC 250 in a 150 lb catchweight bout. He lost the bout via first round submission and was subsequently released from the promotion.

Championships and accomplishments
Ultimate Fighting Championship
Fight of the Night (Four times)
Submission of the Night (One time)

Mixed martial arts record

|-
|Loss
|align=center|
|Herbert Burns
|Submission (rear-naked choke)
|UFC 250
|
|align=center| 1
|align=center| 1:20
|Las Vegas, Nevada, United States
|
|-
|Loss
|align=center|18–8–1
|Francisco Trinaldo
| TKO (knee to the body)
|UFC Fight Night: Santos vs. Anders
|
|align=center|2
|align=center|4:10
|São Paulo, Brazil
|
|-
|Loss
|align=center|18–7–1
|Olivier Aubin-Mercier
|TKO (knees to the body and punches)
|UFC 223
|
|align=center|1
|align=center|0:53
|Brooklyn, New York, United States
|
|-
|Draw
|align=center|18–6–1
|Beneil Dariush
|Draw (majority)
|UFC 216
|
|align=center|3
|align=center|5:00
|Las Vegas, Nevada, United States
|
|-
|Win
|align=center|18–6
|Ricky Glenn
|Decision (unanimous)
|UFC Fight Night: Poirier vs. Johnson
|
|align=center|3
|align=center|5:00
|Hidalgo, Texas, United States
|
|-
|Win
|align=center|17–6
|Joe Lauzon
|Decision (unanimous)
|The Ultimate Fighter: Team McGregor vs. Team Faber Finale
|
|align=center|3
|align=center|5:00
|Las Vegas, Nevada, United States
|
|-
|Win
|align=center|16–6
|Ross Pearson
|Decision (unanimous)
|UFC Fight Night: Bisping vs. Leites
|
|align=center|3
|align=center|5:00
|Glasgow, Scotland
|
|-
| Win
| align=center| 15–6
| Rodrigo Damm
| Decision (unanimous)
| UFC 182
| 
| align=center| 3
| align=center| 5:00
| Las Vegas, Nevada, United States
| 
|-
| Loss
| align=center| 14–6
| Edson Barboza
| TKO (body kick and punches)
| UFC Fight Night: Cowboy vs. Miller
| 
| align=center| 1
| align=center| 3:06
| Atlantic City, New Jersey, United States
| 
|-
| Loss
| align=center| 14–5
| Donald Cerrone
| Submission (triangle choke)
| UFC 167
| 
| align=center| 2
| align=center| 3:49
| Las Vegas, Nevada, United States
| 
|-
| Loss
| align=center| 14–4
| Rafael dos Anjos
| Decision (unanimous)
| UFC on FX: Belfort vs. Rockhold
| 
| align=center| 3
| align=center| 5:00
| Jaraguá do Sul, Brazil
| 
|-
| Win
| align=center| 14–3
| Gleison Tibau
| Decision (split)
| UFC 156
| 
| align=center| 3
| align=center| 5:00
| Las Vegas, Nevada, United States
| 
|-
| Loss
| align=center| 13–3
| T. J. Grant
| Decision (unanimous)
| UFC 152
| 
| align=center| 3
| align=center| 5:00
| Toronto, Ontario, Canada
| 
|-
| Win
| align=center| 13–2
| Nik Lentz
| TKO (doctor stoppage)
| UFC on Fox: Evans vs. Davis
| 
| align=center| 2
| align=center| 5:00
| Chicago, Illinois, United States
| 
|-
| Win
| align=center| 12–2
| Shamar Bailey
| Decision (unanimous)
| UFC Fight Night: Shields vs. Ellenberger
| 
| align=center| 3
| align=center| 5:00
| New Orleans, Louisiana, United States
| 
|-
| Loss
| align=center| 11–2
| Melvin Guillard
| TKO (knees)
| UFC: Fight for the Troops 2
| 
| align=center| 1
| align=center| 2:58
| Fort Hood, Texas, United States
| 
|-
| Loss
| align=center| 11–1
| Sean Sherk
| Decision (split)
| UFC 119
| 
| align=center| 3
| align=center| 5:00
| Indianapolis, Indiana, United States
| 
|-
| Win
| align=center| 11–0
| Tyson Griffin
| Decision (split)
| UFC 115
| 
| align=center| 3
| align=center| 5:00
| Vancouver, British Columbia, Canada
| 
|-
| Win
| align=center| 10–0
| Efrain Escudero
| Submission (armbar)
| UFC Fight Night: Maynard vs. Diaz
| 
| align=center| 3
| align=center| 1:59
| Fairfax, Virginia, United States
| 
|-
| Win
| align=center| 9–0
| Marcus Aurélio
| Decision (split)
| UFC 102
| 
| align=center| 3
| align=center| 5:00
| Portland, Oregon, United States
| 
|-
| Win
| align=center| 8–0
| Per Eklund
| KO (punches)
| UFC 95
| 
| align=center| 1
| align=center| 2:13
| London, England
| 
|-
| Win
| align=center| 7–0
| Dustin Akbari
| Submission (rear-naked choke)
| PFC 12: High Stakes
| 
| align=center| 3
| align=center| 0:40
| Lemoore, California, United States
| 
|-
| Win
| align=center| 6–0
| Eben Kaneshiro
| TKO (punches)
| RFC: Bragging Rights II
| 
| align=center| 2
| align=center| 3:05
| Eugene, Oregon, United States
| 
|-
| Win
| align=center| 5–0
| Cleber Luciano
| Submission (guillotine choke)
| PFP: Ring of Fire
| 
| align=center| 3
| align=center| N/A
| Quezon City, Philippines
| 
|-
| Win
| align=center| 4–0
| Talon Hoffman
| Submission (guillotine choke)
| DesertBrawl
| 
| align=center| 1
| align=center| 0:38
| Bend, Oregon, United States
| 
|-
| Win
| align=center| 3–0
| Mark Daoust
| Submission (rear-naked choke)
| Elite Warriors Championship
| 
| align=center| 1
| align=center| 3:46
| Portland, Oregon, United States
| 
|-
| Win
| align=center| 2–0
| Nassor Lewis
| Submission (armbar)
| Rise FC 2: Hawaii vs. Mainland
| 
| align=center| 1
| align=center| 1:16
| Eugene, Oregon, United States
| 
|-
| Win
| align=center| 1–0
| Gabriel Martinez
| Decision (unanimous)
| GC 62: Sprawl or Brawl
| 
| align=center| 2
| align=center| 5:00
| Lakeport, California, United States
|

See also
 List of current UFC fighters
 List of male mixed martial artists

References

External links

Living people
1981 births
American male mixed martial artists
Mixed martial artists from Oregon
Lightweight mixed martial artists
Mixed martial artists utilizing wrestling
Mixed martial artists utilizing boxing
Mixed martial artists utilizing Brazilian jiu-jitsu
American practitioners of Brazilian jiu-jitsu
People awarded a black belt in Brazilian jiu-jitsu
Sportspeople from Eugene, Oregon
Oregon Ducks wrestlers
Wrestlers from Oregon
Winston Churchill High School (Eugene, Oregon) alumni
Ultimate Fighting Championship male fighters